Vlkoš is a municipality and village in Přerov District in the Olomouc Region of the Czech Republic. It has about 700 inhabitants.

Administrative parts
The village of Kanovsko is an administrative part of Vlkoš.

References

Villages in Přerov District